Pleuroxia is a genus of air-breathing land snails, terrestrial gastropod mollusks in the subfamily Hadrinae of the family Camaenidae.

Species
Species within the genus Pleuroxia include:
 Pleuroxia abstans Iredale, 1939
 Pleuroxia carmeena G.A. Solem, 1993
 Pleuroxia clydonigera R. Tate, 1894
 Pleuroxia cyrtopleura (Pfeiffer, 1862)
 Pleuroxia everardensis (Bednall, 1892)
 Pleuroxia italowiana Solem, 1992
 Pleuroxia lemani G.P.L.K. Gude, 1916
 Pleuroxia overlanderensis G.A. Solem, 1997
 Pleuroxia phillipsiana (Angas, 1873)
Synonyms
 Pleuroxia adcockiana (Bednall, 1894): synonym of Granulomelon adcockianum (Bednall, 1894)
 Pleuroxia arcigerens Tate, 1894: synonym of Granulomelon adcockianum (Bednall, 1894)
 Pleuroxia bethana Solem, 1997: synonym of Basedowena bethana (Solem, 1997) (original combination)
 Pleuroxia commenta Iredale, 1939: synonym of Basedowena polypleura (Tate, 1899) (junior synonym)
 Pleuroxia cooperi Cotton, 1939: synonym of Pleuroxia phillipsiana (Angas, 1873) (junior synonym)
 Pleuroxia elfina Iredale, 1939: synonym of Basedowena elfina (Iredale, 1939)
 Pleuroxia hinsbyi Gude, 1916: synonym of Basedowena hinsbyi (Gude, 1916) (superseded combination)
 Pleuroxia mawsoni Iredale, 1937: synonym of Cooperconcha mawsoni (Iredale, 1937) (original combination)
 Pleuroxia musga Iredale, 1937: synonym of Tatemelon musgum (Iredale, 1937) (original combination)
 Pleuroxia oligopleura (Tate, 1894): synonym of Basedowena oligopleura (Tate, 1894)
 Pleuroxia polypleura (Tate, 1899): synonym of Basedowena polypleura (Tate, 1899)
 Pleuroxia radiata (Hedley, 1905): synonym of Basedowena radiata (Hedley, 1905)
 Pleuroxia ruga otton, 1953: synonym of Strepsitaurus rugus (Cotton, 1953) (original combination)

References

External links
 Ancey, C. F. (1887). Description of new genera or subgenera of Helicidæ. The Conchologists' Exchange. 1(9-10): 53-54
 Angas, G. F. (1864). On the land-shells of South Australia. Proceedings of the Zoological Society of London. 1863: 519-529

 
Camaenidae
Taxa named by César Marie Félix Ancey
Taxonomy articles created by Polbot